Owen Madden (5 December 1916 – 20 January 1991) was an Irish footballer who played as a forward in the League of Ireland and the English Football League. Madden was a dual international who played for both Ireland teams – the FAI XI and the IFA XI.

Club career 
Madden first came to prominence as a goalscorer with Cork and in 1936 he helped the club reach the final of the FAI Cup. However shortly afterwards he became embroiled in controversy when it emerged that, together with Jack O'Reilly, he had signed for Norwich City before playing in the cup final on 19 April. When Cork F.C., who received no fee, protested over the moves, both Madden and O'Reilly were suspended by the FAI for three years. Despite this Madden failed to establish himself at either Norwich or Birmingham. The only highlight of his time in England came when he scored twice for Birmingham in an FA Cup tie against Everton on 11 February 1939. This game attracted a record attendance of 66,844 at St Andrew's.

Madden returned to the League of Ireland to play for a very successful Cork United team during the Second World War. His United teammates included, among others, Jack O'Reilly, Florrie Burke, Bill Hayes, Jackie O'Driscoll, Frank O'Farrell and Tommy Moroney. During the 1941–42 season he helped United to a League and Cup double, scoring 14 league goals in the process.

Irish international
When Madden began his international career in 1948 there were, in effect, two Ireland teams, chosen by two rival associations. Both associations, the Northern Ireland-based IFA and the Irish Free State-based FAI, claimed jurisdiction over the whole of Ireland and selected players from the whole island. As a result, several notable Irish players from this era, including Madden, played for both teams.

FAI XI
While still a Cork player, Madden made his only appearance for the FAI XI during a European tour on 3 May 1936. He played in the opening game, a 3–3 draw with Hungary. Madden is credited by some sources with scoring the third Irish goal. However it has also been credited to Jimmy Dunne. Madden was injured during the game and took no further part in the tour, returning to his new club, Norwich City, for treatment. After being suspended by the FAI for three years, Madden was recalled in 1939 to play against Hungary but he declined the offer.

IFA XI
While playing for Norwich City, Madden made his one and only appearances for the IFA XI on 23 October 1937 in a 5–1 defeat against England at Windsor Park. His teammates that day included fellow dual internationalists Tommy Breen, Bill Hayes and Alex Stevenson.

Honours

Cork/Cork City

FAI Cup: runners up 1936
Munster Senior Cup: 1939

Cork United

League of Ireland: 1941, 1942, 1943, 1945, 1946
FAI Cup: 1942, 1947
League of Ireland Shield: 1943, 1948
Munster Senior Cup: 1941, 1945, 1946, 1947

References

External links
 Northern Ireland's Footballing Greats

1916 births
1991 deaths
Republic of Ireland association footballers
Pre-1950 IFA international footballers
Irish Free State association footballers
Dual Irish international footballers
League of Ireland players
Cork F.C. players
Cork United F.C. (1940–1948) players
Cork Athletic F.C. players
Sligo Rovers F.C. players
Norwich City F.C. players
Birmingham City F.C. players
League of Ireland XI players
English Football League players
Irish Free State international footballers
Cork City F.C. (1938–1940) players
Association football forwards